Floyd Clair "Tally" Stevens (October 30, 1923 – August 9, 1995) was an American football player and coach.  He served as the head football coach at Brigham Young University (BYU) from 1959 to 1960, compiling a record of 6–15.  Steven played college football at the University of Utah as an end.  He died on August 9, 1995.

Stevens interrupted his college football career to serve in the United States Army Air Forces during World War II. He was an assistant coach with BYU for three years before he became head coach for two.

Head coaching record

College

References

External links
 

1923 births
1995 deaths
United States Army Air Forces personnel of World War II
American football ends
BYU Cougars football coaches
Utah Utes football players
High school football coaches in Utah
People from Oakley, Utah
People from Uinta County, Wyoming